is a Japanese racewalking athlete. He is a graduate of Toyo University. 

Ikeda won a bronze medal in 20 kilometres race walk at the 2019 Asian Race Walking Championships in Nomi. He represented Japan at the 2019 World Athletics Championships, competing in 20 kilometres walk. He won a silver medal at 2020 Summer Olympics and the 2022 World Athletics Championships in the same event.

See also
2019 IAAF World Rankings

References

External links

Japanese male racewalkers
1998 births
Living people
World Athletics Championships athletes for Japan
World Athletics Championships medalists
World Athletics Race Walking Team Championships winners
Universiade gold medalists in athletics (track and field)
Universiade gold medalists for Japan
Medalists at the 2019 Summer Universiade
Athletes (track and field) at the 2020 Summer Olympics
Medalists at the 2020 Summer Olympics
Olympic silver medalists in athletics (track and field)
Olympic silver medalists for Japan
Olympic athletes of Japan
20th-century Japanese people
21st-century Japanese people